The Nairobi–Malaba Road, also Nairobi–Uganda Road or A104 Road  (Kenya) is a major highway in Kenya, the largest economy in the East African Community. The road connects Nairobi, the capital and largest city in Kenya, with the border town of  Malaba at the international border with Uganda.

Location

The road starts in the city of Nairobi and takes a general north-westerly direction through Naivasha, Nakuru, Eldoret and Bungoma, to end at Malaba, a distance of approximately  The coordinates of this road in the city of Eldoret, Uasin Gishu County are: 0°30'23.0"N,  35°17'57.0"E (Latitude:0.506389; Longitude:35.299167).

Overview
This road, together with the Nairobi–Mombasa Road, are part of The Great North Road, which connects the landlocked countries of Burundi, Eastern DR Congo, Rwanda, Uganda and South Sudan to the Kenyan coast at Mombasa, on the Indian Ocean.

Due to the volume of traffic, and the concentration of heavy-duty transport vehicles, the route is accident-prone, accounting for a large number of injuries and fatalities in the region. In 2013 alone, 3,179 people lost their lives in traffic accidents on the combined Mombasa–Malaba Road.

Intersections

 Nairobi–Mombasa Road
 Nairobi–Thika Road
 Suam–Endebess–Kitale–Eldoret Road
 Kisumu–Kakamega–Webuye–Kitale Road
 Tororo–Malaba Road in Uganda

Towns
The following towns, listed from east towards west, are located along the highway:

See also
 Nairobi–Nakuru–Mau Summit Highway
 Dongo Kundu Bypass Highway

References

External links
Website of Kenya National Highways Authority

Roads in Kenya
Geography of Kenya
Streets in Nairobi
Kiambu County
Nakuru County
Baringo County
Uasin Gishu County
Bungoma County
Busia County